Gambling, other than betting on horse races or the government-sponsored Thai lottery, is prohibited in Thailand. The prohibition dates back to the Gambling Act 1935. The Playing Cards Act prohibits private ownership of more than 120 playing cards without approval of the government. Nevertheless, illegal gambling in casinos (Thai: บ่อนการพนัน) and other forms of gambling still exist in Bangkok and some provincial towns.

History 
Gambling has long been a feature of Thai society. Local Siamese partook in more than 100 well known gambling games. Some gambling forms such as betting on cockfights, bullfights and boat races are native to Siamese culture.

The late-19th century marked a significant increase in the level of gambling in Siam. People started to gamble more frequently and a variety of games were introduced from foreign traders and immigrants, and gambling started to hit the mainstream. It was during that period that the Huay lottery was introduced from China and became popular in Siam.

Over the course of decades the Government of Thailand allowed legal gambling dens. During the reign of King Rama III, the Government of Thailand promoted legal gambling dens as a source of revenue. These legal dens were then closed down to dampen criminal activity and bankruptcy related to gambling. During the reign of King Rama V gambling was forbidden in the south and all the remaining gambling venues were closed on 1 April 1917.

A gambling act was first passed in 1930 and revised in 1935. During the premiership of Khuang Aphaiwong, the ministry of finance was assigned by the government to legalize gambling in Pran Buri District, Prachuap Khiri Khan Province and became an official promoter of gambling. However, this period of legalization of casinos did not last long. Under attack from the media and public, the government abandoned the attempt to earn additional revenue from casinos and prohibited gambling once again.

Forms of gambling

Casinos
Despite laws against gambling, illegal casinos are widespread in Thailand. The first large-scale gambling houses were established in Ayutthaya by the government in the late-17th century or early-18th century as a result of the steady growth of Chinese population. During the 19th century the number of gambling houses grew in tandem with the population of Chinese immigrants. To promote the settlement and taxation of the Chinese population in Thailand, the Thai government turned a blind eye to gambling among Chinese immigrants. As a result of this inadvertent endorsement, local Siamese were encouraged to gamble as well. After the gambling act was first passed in 1930 casinos were banned completely and gambling was prohibited in Thai society.

Lottery 
The lottery was introduced to Thailand by Chinese immigrants in 1820. Commonly known to the local as "huay", the term is a direct translation of Chinese word huā (Chinese:花) :flower. In the beginning huay was mainly played among the community of Chinese immigrants in Thailand. It was then officially established during the reign of King Rama III to stimulate the circulation of currency as well as to generate national revenue.

Government lottery
In the reign of King Rama VI, the government introduced lottery draws as a device for tax collection. In 1939 the government of Field Marshal Plaek Phibunsongkhram set up the Lottery Bureau to organize a regular monthly draw in Thailand. It was then extended to twice a month in 1989. Draws normally happen twice a month on the 1st and 16th. There are a total of 38 million tickets per round. 28 percent of the sales value of the lottery ticket is retained as government revenue, 12 percent in administration and management and 60 percent is returned to players as prizes.

Gambling on sport 
Football is the most recent form of illegal gambling in Thailand. As a result of technology such as online transactions, satellite TV, Internet, and mobile phone betting systems, football gambling has become widely spread among the population of Thailand. During the 2010 South Africa World cup, over 1,700 people were arrested for gambling offences.

Online gambling 
Online gambling is illegal in Thailand. In 2020, as a part of a campaign against online casinos, the Ministry of Digital Economy and Society began to cooperate with other state agencies to block websites that provide such services. According to the ministry, more than 1 billion baht ($32 million) pass through these sites every year. During a raid in October 2020, the largest group of people in the history of the country, who owned an online casino, was arrested. According to the head of the national police, the group used 38 bank accounts, spending through them at least 15 billion baht ($480m). Later a 190 websites were blocked, mostly online casinos and porn sites, including Pornhub. This ban sparked a wave of protests and accusations of censorship.

Social issues
Thai society has long frowned on gambling. In Buddhism, gambling is one of four vices which lead to ruin. In Thai this concept is known as abaiyamuk (อบายมุข), the "portals of hell". For the layperson, gambling is something to be avoided if one wishes to be free from suffering. Thai people often cite an old proverb "Ten robberies leave you a house, ten fires leave you a land, gambling once leave you noting." which reflects the variety of social problems associated with gambling in Thai culture. This may include violent crime, financial problems, and gambling addiction. Despite the prohibition, gambling still remains a major part of Thai life. Thais often gamble in various ceremonies and festivals. According to Alan Klima's study of funeral casinos in present-day Thailand, gambling is used as an attraction for people to keep the deceased spirit company.

There are only a few psychological services available to those addicted, the such as Ministry of Public Health's Center of Gambling Studies. For Thais, gambling—lotteries, casinos, football betting and other variants—are viewed as entertainment. Very few seek treatment from medical professionals as Thais often view gambling as a social problem rather than a medical issue.

References

Further reading
 Apinuntavech S (n.d.) เยาวชนกับการพนันในมุมมองของจิตแพทย์เด็กและวัยรุ่น  Thailand:(n.p.).
 Oxford Dictionary(2010) Manser, M.H., Yuan, Z., Liangbi, W., Yongchang, R., Jingrong, W. (Eds.): Pocket Oxford Chinese Dictionary. Oxford: OUP Oxford.
Apinuntavech S. (2012). Consequences and Associated Factors of Youth Gambling. Retrieved from http://www2.ph.mahidol.ac.th/research/thai/jmedassocthai/Vol95_Suppl6/S21-S29_MD31.pdf
Phongpaichit,P (1999). THAILAND'S ILLEGAL ECONOMY AND PUBLIC POLICY. Paper presented at Centre of Southeast Asian Studies: Kyoto University.

External links
 The Government Lottery Office
 Center for Gambling Studies
 Thailand Gambling Studies
 Thailand Pg Slots 

 
Thai culture
Law of Thailand